DreamHack Open Austin 2016 was a Counter-Strike: Global Offensive LAN Tournament hosted by the Swedish eSports company DreamHack. It took place from May 6–8 at the Austin Convention Center in Austin, Texas. DH Austin featured six North American teams, and two South American teams. They competed for a $100,000 prize pool. In the finals, Luminosity Gaming, the then world champions after winning MLG Columbus 2016, defeated its fellow Brazilian team Tempo Storm, 2–0, to win Dream Hack Open Austin 2016.

Qualifier

Teams

Broadcast Talent
Desk Host
 Alex "Machine" Richardson
Host
 Sue "Smix" Lee
Commentators
 Joey "heliumbrella" Cunningham
 Mohan "launders" Govindasamy
 John "BLU" Mullen
 Jason "moses" O'Toole
Analysts
 Stephanie "missharvey" Harvey
 Janko "YNk" Paunović

Groups

Group A

Group B

Playoffs

Semifinals Scores

Finals Scores

Final standings

References 

DreamHack events
2010s in Austin, Texas
2016 in Texas
2016 in esports
Counter-Strike competitions